Alano may refer to:

Alano Español, a dog breed
Alano (name)
Alano (motorcycle), an Italian motorcycle

See also
Alano club, a discreet name used for community centers where meetings of Alcoholics Anonymous and other 12 step recovery groups are held.
Alano di Piave, a comune in Veneto, Italy